At the Opera House is a 1958 live album by Ella Fitzgerald. The album presents a recording of the 1957 Jazz at the Philharmonic Concerts. This series of live jazz concerts was devised by Fitzgerald's manager Norman Granz; they ran from 1944 to 1983. Featured on this occasion, in 1957, are Fitzgerald and the leading jazz players of the day in an onstage jam session. The first half of the 1990 CD edition includes a performance that was recorded on September 29, 1957, at the Chicago Opera House, whilst the second half highlights the concert recorded on October 7, 1957, at the Shrine Auditorium, in Los Angeles. The original LP obviously included only the mono tracks (#10-18).

This album is typical of Ella's concert repertoire in the mid 1950s, singing swing standards, and songs referencing her recent 'Songbook' series, in this case, the Cole Porter and Rodgers and Hart songbooks.

Reception

Writing for Allmusic, music critic Scott Yanow wrote of the album "... this album is mostly recommended to her greatest fans. However, the music is wonderful, there are variations between the different versions, and her voice was at its prime".[1]

For the 1986 Verve CD re-issue Ella Fitzgerald at the Opera House, Verve 831-269-2

Track listing

"It's All Right with Me" (Cole Porter)  – 2:32
"Don'cha Go 'Way Mad" (Jimmy Mundy, Illinois Jacquet, Al Stillman)  – 2:42
"Bewitched, Bothered and Bewildered" (Richard Rodgers, Lorenz Hart)  – 3:01
"These Foolish Things (Remind Me of You)" (Jack Strachey, Harry Link, Holt Marvell)  – 3:46
"Ill Wind" (Harold Arlen, Ted Koehler)  – 2:47
"Goody Goody" (Johnny Mercer, Matty Malneck)  – 1:54
"Moonlight in Vermont" (Karl Suessdorf, John Blackburn)  – 3:06
"Them There Eyes" (Maceo Pinkard, Doris Tauber, William Tracey)  – 2:08
"Stompin' at the Savoy" (Benny Goodman, Edgar Sampson, Chick Webb, Andy Razaf)  – 5:14

Tracks 1-9 recorded in stereo on the 29th of September 1957 at the Chicago Opera House.

"It's All Right with Me"  – 2:45
"Don'cha Go Way Mad"  – 2:31
"Bewitched, Bothered and Bewildered"  – 3:22
"These Foolish Things"  – 3:49
"Ill Wind"  – 2:53
"Goody Goody"  – 1:55
"Moonlight in Vermont"  – 3:15
"Stompin' at the Savoy"  – 7:15
"Oh, Lady Be Good!" (George Gershwin, Ira Gershwin)  – 4:25

Tracks 10-18 recorded in mono on the 7th of October 1957 at the Shrine Auditorium, Los Angeles.

Personnel

Tracks 1-8, 10-16
 Ella Fitzgerald - Vocals
 Oscar Peterson - Piano
 Herb Ellis - Guitar
 Ray Brown - Bass
 Jo Jones - Drums

Tracks 9, 17-18
 Ella Fitzgerald - Vocals
 Oscar Peterson - Piano
 Herb Ellis - Guitar
 Ray Brown - Bass
 Connie Kay - Drums
 Roy Eldridge - Trumpet
 J. J. Johnson - Trombone
 Sonny Stitt - Alto Sax
 Lester Young - Tenor Sax
 Illinois Jacquet - Tenor Sax
 Coleman Hawkins - Tenor Sax
 Stan Getz - Tenor Sax
 Flip Phillips - Tenor Sax

References 

Ella Fitzgerald live albums
Albums produced by Norman Granz
1958 live albums
Verve Records live albums